Pinchem (sometimes spelled "Penchem") is an unincorporated community located in Todd County, Kentucky, United States. It is concentrated around the intersection of Kentucky Route 848 and Kentucky Route 181, southeast of Trenton, and a few miles north of the Kentucky-Tennessee state line.  The place was also called Pinchem Slyly in regard to obtaining illegal alcohol.

References

Unincorporated communities in Todd County, Kentucky
Unincorporated communities in Kentucky